Changqing may refer to the following locations in China:

Changqing District (长清区), Jinan, Shandong
Changqing National Nature Reserve (长青自然保护区), in the Qinling Mountains of Shaanxi
Changqing Road Station (长清路站), station of the Shanghai Metro
Changqing, Fujian (长庆镇), town in Yongtai County
Changqing, Jiangsu (常青镇), town in Rugao City

Subdistricts
Changqing Subdistrict, Baicheng (长庆街道), in Taobei District, Baicheng, Jilin
Changqing Subdistrict, Hangzhou (长庆街道), in Xiacheng District, Hangzhou, Zhejiang

 Changqing, Loudi (长青街道),  a subdistrict of Louxing District, Loudi City, Hunan.

Written as "常青街道":
Changqing Subdistrict, Jianghan District, Wuhan, Hubei
Changqing Subdistrict, Hefei, in Baohe District, Hefei, Anhui
Changqing Subdistrict, Ulanqab, in Jining District, Ulanqab, Inner Mongolia
Changqing Subdistrict, Anshan, in Tiedong District, Anshan, Liaoning
Changqing Subdistrict, Changzhi, in Chengqu, Changzhi, Shanxi